St Mary's Church is in West Road, Congleton, Cheshire, England.  It is a Roman Catholic church recorded in the National Heritage List for England as a designated Grade II listed building.   The listing includes the adjoining presbytery.

History

St Mary's Church was built in 1826, and designed by Father John Hall, a priest from Macclesfield.  The presbytery dates from 1830.

Architecture

The church is constructed in red brick, stands on a stone plinth, and has a slate roof.  The façade facing the road is in two storeys.  It has a central doorway with a semicircular head and a radial fanlight, and two windows also with semicircular heads.  At the top is a pediment containing a niche with a statue of the Virgin Mary.  The east end is slightly polygonal.  Inside the church is a tripartite screen carried on Ionic columns.  The authors of the Buildings of England series comment that, apart from the niche containing the statue, it is similar to a Methodist church of the time.  The presbytery also has a doorway with a semicircular head and a radial fanlight.  Its windows are sashes.

See also

Listed buildings in Congleton

References

Roman Catholic churches in Cheshire
Grade II listed churches in Cheshire
Roman Catholic churches completed in 1823
19th-century Roman Catholic church buildings in the United Kingdom
Roman Catholic Diocese of Shrewsbury